The Electoral (Amendment) Act 2009 (No. 4) is a law of Ireland which amended electoral law, including revisions to Dáil constituencies and European Parliament constituencies in light of the 2006 census. The new European Parliament constituencies were used at the election in June 2009. The revision to Dáil constituencies took effect on the dissolution of the 30th Dáil on 1 February 2011 and a general election for the 31st Dáil on the revised constituencies took place on 25 February 2011.

Revision to constituencies
In April 2007, the Minister for the Environment, Heritage and Local Government established an independent Constituency Commission under the terms of the Electoral Act 1997. Its report proposed several changes to Dáil constituencies. The commission was chaired by Iarfhlaith O'Neill, judge of the High Court, and delivered its report later in 2007.

The Act implemented the recommendations of this report and repealed the Electoral (Amendment) (No. 2) Act 1998, which had defined constituencies since the 2007 general election. The size of the Dáil remained at 166, arranged in 43 constituencies.

The Dáil constituencies in this Act were repealed by the Electoral (Amendment) (Dáil Constituencies) Act 2013, which created a new schedule of constituencies first used at the 2016 general election for the 32nd Dáil held on 26 February 2016.

Electoral law amendments
The Act amended the provisions of the Electoral Act 1997 on the establishment of the Constituency Commission to provide that it would be established on the release of preliminary results of the census. This was in response to finding of the High Court in Murphy v. Minister for Environment (2007). It also amended the European Parliament Elections Act 1997 and the Local Elections Regulations to amend the provisions for the nomination of Independent candidates. This was in response to the finding of the Supreme Court in Cooney v. Minister for the Environment (2006).

Constituencies for the 31st Dáil
''Explanation of columns
Constituency: The name of the constituency.
Created: The year of the election when a constituency of the same name was last created.
Seats: The number of TDs elected from the constituency under the Act.
Change: Change in the number of seats since the last distribution of seats (which took effect in 2007).

Summary of changes
This table summarises changes in representation. It does not address revisions to the boundaries of constituencies.

There were further boundary changes to 18 constituencies: Cork East, Cork North-Central, Cork North-West, Donegal North-East, Donegal South-West, Dublin North, Dublin North-Central, Dublin North-East, Dublin South, Kerry South, Kildare North, Kildare South, Laois–Offaly, Meath East, Meath West, Roscommon–South Leitrim, Sligo–North Leitrim and Tipperary North.

European Parliament constituencies
The constituencies below replaced the constituencies which were in operation at the 2004 European Parliament election, with a reduction in the total number of seats from 13 to 12 in light of the increased size of the European Parliament on the accession of Bulgaria and Romania to the European Union in 2007.

They were in turn replaced by the European Parliament Elections (Amendment) Act 2014, with a reduced number of seats to 11 for the 2014 European Parliament election, following the accession of Croatia in 2013.

References

2009 in Irish law
Acts of the Oireachtas of the 2000s
Electoral 2009
2011 Irish general election